Alexander McCabe ( 5 June 1886 – 31 May 1972) was an Irish Sinn Féin (later Cumann na nGaedheal) politician.

Early life
He was born in Keash, County Sligo in 1886. He was educated at Summerhill College, Sligo. He won a scholarship to St Patrick's College of Education, Drumcondra, Dublin, and later obtained a diploma from University College Dublin. He was appointed headmaster of Drumnagranchy national school, County Sligo in 1907. He joined the Irish Republican Brotherhood in 1913.

Politics
He was elected as a Sinn Féin MP for the constituency of Sligo South at the 1918 general election. In January 1919, Sinn Féin MPs refused to recognise the Parliament of the United Kingdom and instead assembled at the Mansion House in Dublin as a revolutionary parliament called Dáil Éireann, though McCabe did not attend as he was in prison in Lincoln Gaol.

At the 1921 Irish elections, he was re-elected for Sligo–Mayo East. He supported the Anglo-Irish Treaty and voted in favour of it. He was again re-elected for Sligo–Mayo East at the 1922 general election, this time as pro-Treaty Sinn Féin Teachta Dála (TD). During the Treaty debate he asserted that the  counties of Ulster which comprised "Northern Ireland" could never be incorporated into an Irish Republic while the British Empire was what it was.

At the 1923 general election, he was elected as a Cumann na nGaedheal TD for Leitrim–Sligo. He resigned from Cumann na nGaedheal in 1924 because of dissatisfaction with government attitude to certain army officers and joined the National Party led by Joseph McGrath.

He resigned his Dáil seat on 30 October 1924 along with several other TDs, and the resulting by-election on 11 March 1925 was won by the Cumann na nGaedheal candidate Martin Roddy. He did not stand for public office again and returned to his post as a schoolteacher.

In the 1930s he was involved with the short-lived but widely followed Irish Christian Front, serving as the organisation's secretary and announcing its creation to the public on 22 August 1936. He was also a member of the Blueshirts during this period and the later the Irish Friends of Germany (later known as the 'National Club') during the Second World War, a would-be Nazi Collaborator group in the event Germany invaded Ireland. McCabe chaired their meetings, denied the group was a fifth column and expressed the belief that a German victory would lead to a United Ireland. He was interned in 1940–1941 because of his pro-German sympathies, which he claimed resulted from the desire to ‘see the very life-blood squeezed out of England’.

After politics
In 1935 he co-founded the Educational Building Society (EBS) with Thomas J. O'Connell. He retired from teaching in the 1940s and became the full-time managing director of the EBS.

Sources
 Todd Andrews (1979), Dublin Made Me.
 Robert Fisk (1983), In Time of War.

References

Gallery

1886 births
1972 deaths
Cumann na nGaedheal TDs
Early Sinn Féin TDs
Irish anti-communists
Irish far-right politicians
Irish fascists
Members of the 1st Dáil
Members of the 2nd Dáil
Members of the 3rd Dáil
Members of the 4th Dáil
Members of the Blueshirts
Members of the Parliament of the United Kingdom for County Sligo constituencies (1801–1922)
Politicians imprisoned during the Irish revolutionary period
UK MPs 1918–1922
Alumni of St Patrick's College, Dublin
Alumni of University College Dublin
People educated at Summerhill College